El Equilibrio de los Jaguares is an album recorded by Mexican rock band Jaguares. The debut LP was released on September 17, 1996 under the label Bertelsmann de Mexico (BMG).

Lead singer and songwriter Saúl Hernández and drummer Alfonso André credited as the only members of the band. Guest musicians include José Manuel Aguilera, Federico Fong, Cecilia Toussaint, Benmont Tench, Billy Preston and Flaco Jiménez.

Track listing

Personnel
 Saul Hernández – vocals, acoustic guitar, electric guitar
 Alfonso Andre – drums
 Jose Manuel Aguilera – electric guitar
 Federico Fong – bass guitar

Other personnel
 Mark Isham – trumpet
 Flaco Jiménez – accordion
 Billy Preston – organ, keyboards
 Benmont Tench – keyboards
 Cecilia Toussaint - vocals
 Tracy Bartelle – vocals
 Gabe Witcher – violin

References 

1996 debut albums
Jaguares (band) albums
Albums produced by Don Was